Ian Miller (born September 28, 1991) is an American professional basketball player for BC Enisey of the VTB United League. He played college basketball for Florida State University before playing professionally in Italy, Kazakhstan, Turkey, France, Israel, and Greece.

Early life and college career
Miller attended United Faith Christian Academy in Charlotte, North Carolina, where he averaged 22 points, 6 rebounds and 6 assists, leading United Faith to the 1-A State Championship as a senior.

Miller played college basketball for Florida State University's Seminoles, where he averaged 13.7 points and 2.5 rebounds per game in a non-starting role as a senior. Miller also topped the charts for sixth men in assists (2.96), steals (0.87) and free throw percentage (.877). Miller was named ACC Sixth Man of the Year and All-ACC Honorable Mention by the coaches.

Professional career

Aurora Jesi (2014–2015)
After going undrafted in the 2014 NBA draft, Miller joined the Detroit Pistons for the 2015 NBA Summer League, where he averaged 9.7 points and 3 assists per game.

On August 6, 2014, Miller started his professional career with the Italian team Aurora Jesi of the Serie A2, signing a one-year deal. On October 5, 2014, Miller recorded 43 points in his professional debut, shooting 10-of-15 from three-point range in a 74–82 loss to Brescia.

Auxilium CUS Torino (2015–2016)
On January 29, 2015, Miller parted ways with Jesi to join PMS Torino for the rest of the season. Miller won the 2015 Serie A2 Championship, earning a promotion to the Serie A.

On July 9, 2015, Miller signed a one-year contract extension with Torino.

Tenezis Verona (2016)
On March 17, 2016, Miller parted ways with Torino to join Tenezis Verona for the rest of the season. In 8 games played for Verona, he averaged 15.6 points, 3.3 rebounds, 2.1 assists and 1.2 steals per game.

Astana (2016–2017)
On August 3, 2016, Miller signed with the Kazakh team Astana for the 2016–17 season. On October 2, 2016, Miller recorded a season-high 32 points, along with 5 assists, 3 rebounds and 2 steals in an 83–78 win over Avtodor Saratov.

In 27 games played during the 2016–17 season, he averaged 14.7 points, 2.8 rebounds and 3.8 assists per game. Miller won the 2017 Kazakhstan League Championship and the 2017 Kazakhstan Cup titles with Astana, as well as reaching the 2017 VTB United League Quarterfinals, where they eventually lost to CSKA Moscow.

Uşak Sportif (2017–2018)
On June 17, 2017, Miller signed with the Turkish team Uşak Sportif. On October 28, 2017, Miller recorded a season-high 22 points, shooting 9-of-14 from the field, along with three assists and three steals in a 70-77 loss to Beşiktaş.

Gravelines (2018)
On March 27, 2018, Miller parted ways with Uşak to join the French team BCM Gravelines for the rest of the season.

Hapoel Gilboa Galil (2018–2019)
On July 13, 2018, Miller signed with Hapoel Gilboa Galil for the 2018–19 season. On October 27, 2018, Miller recorded a season-high 31 points, shooting 6-of-9 from three-point range, along with four rebounds and two assists in a 101–99 win over Hapoel Jerusalem. He was subsequently named Israeli League Round 4 MVP. In 29 games played for Gilboa Galil, he averaged 15.4 points, 2.3 rebounds and 2.6 assists per game, while shooting 41 percent from three-point range.

Chorale Roanne (2019–2020)
On July 27, 2019, Miller returned to France for a second stint, signing a one-year deal with Chorale Roanne.

Promitheas Patras (2020–2021)
On July 27, 2020, Miller signed with Promitheas Patras of the Greek Basket League.

Cholet Basket (2021)
On February 28, 2021, he signed with Cholet Basket of the French LNB Pro A.

Peristeri (2021)
On July 20, 2021, he signed with Peristeri of the Greek Basket League. On December 29, 2021, Miller mutually parted ways with the Greek club. He averaged 10.4 points, 2.4 assists and 1.3 rebounds per contest.

Büyükçekmece Basketbol (2021–2022)
On December 31, 2021, Miller signed with Büyükçekmece Basketbol of the Turkish Basketbol Süper Ligi.

Enisey (2022–present)
On August 18, 2022, he has signed with BC Enisey of the VTB United League.

Honours
Greek Basketball Super Cup: (2020)

References

External links
Florida State Seminoles bio
RealGM profile

1991 births
Living people
21st-century African-American sportspeople
African-American basketball players
American expatriate basketball people in France
American expatriate basketball people in Greece
American expatriate basketball people in Israel
American expatriate basketball people in Italy
American expatriate basketball people in Kazakhstan
American expatriate basketball people in Turkey
American men's basketball players
Auxilium Pallacanestro Torino players
Basketball players from Charlotte, North Carolina
BC Astana players
BCM Gravelines players
Büyükçekmece Basketbol players
Chorale Roanne Basket players
Cholet Basket players
Florida State Seminoles men's basketball players
Hapoel Gilboa Galil Elyon players
Parade High School All-Americans (boys' basketball)
Peristeri B.C. players
Promitheas Patras B.C. players
Point guards
Scaligera Basket Verona players
Shooting guards
Uşak Sportif players